Lalkamal Bhowmick (born 2 January 1987 in Kolkata) is an Indian footballer who plays as a midfielder for Pathachakra in the Calcutta Football League.

Career
He joined SAIL Football Academy in Bokaro and was there for four years, before joining Eveready (Chirag United). Following that he joined  Mohun Bagan.

He spent four seasons at Mohun Bagan. He was voted the best young player of the Year for the 2007 I-League season for his excellent performances for Bagan. In December 2008 he scored in the group stage of the Federation Cup, and Mohun Bagan went on to win the tournament.

As of September 2012 he was playing for Prayag United in the I-League.

He only played 9 games for United in the 2013-14 season due to injury. In May 2014 Bhowmick announced that he was rejoining former club Mohun Bagan for the 2014-15 season. He left United because of the club's financial troubles.

International career
In February 2013, he was named in the India national football team for the 2014 AFC Challenge Cup qualifiers.

References

External links
 http://www.rediff.com/sports/2007/mar/29nfl.htm

Indian footballers
India international footballers
India youth international footballers
1987 births
Living people
I-League players
Mohun Bagan AC players
United SC players
Footballers from Kolkata
Association football midfielders